St. Mark's Eve is the day before the feast day of St. Mark the Evangelist. In liturgical Christian churches, this feast of St. Mark is observed on 25 April of each year; thus St. Mark's Eve is 24 April.

English folklore
It was the custom in villages in England, from the 17th century to the late 19th century, to sit in the church porch on St. Mark's Eve. Those sitting had to keep silent between the bell tolling at 11.00 p.m. until the bell struck 1.00 a.m. In Yorkshire it was necessary to keep vigil for three successive nights. On the third such sitting, it was said that the ghosts of those to die during the year would be witnessed passing into the church. This practice took place throughout England, but was most prevalent in northern and western counties.

Some accounts of the custom state that the watchers must be fasting, or must circle the church before taking up position.  The ghosts of those who were to die soon would be the first observed, while those who would almost see out the year would not be witnessed until almost 1.00 a.m.  Other variations of the superstition say that the watchers would see headless or rotting corpses, or coffins approaching. Another tradition holds that a young woman can see the face of her future husband appear on her smock by holding it before the fire on St Mark's Eve.

In popular literature
 The Eve of St. Mark, a poem by John Keats
 The Eve of St. Mark, a 1942 play by Maxwell Anderson
 Washington Irving included a story called "St. Mark's Eve" in his 1822 collection, Bracebridge Hall. The story describes several British superstitions about the souls of those soon to die appearing at the local church steps on St. Mark's Eve
 The Eve of St. Mark, a 1944 motion picture based on the play with several actors of the 1942 production reprising their roles in the film. One of the conditions of Anderson selling the film rights to the play was that it not appear before January 1944, after the play had completed its run. 20th Century Fox reshot the ending when test audiences did not like the original ending of the play.
 The Raven Cycle by Maggie Stiefvater.

References

External links
 "Custom demised: Porch Watching on St Mark’s Eve", In search of Traditional Customs and Ceremonies

English folklore
Mark's Eve
April observances